Number One of Three is the first studio album of the project The Body Lovers / The Body Haters, released on April 21, 1998 by Atavistic and Young God Records. The album was released under the name "The Body Lovers". Last Sigh Magazine gave the album a positive write-up and said "there are VERY few things I've ever heard quite this enigmatic and beautiful."

Track listing

Personnel
Adapted from the Number One of Three liner notes.

Michael Gira – acoustic guitar, electric guitar, harmonica, keyboards, vocals, musical arrangement, production
Musicians
 Bill Bronson – bass guitar, melodica
 Thomas Dodd – Celtic harp
 Kris Force – viola, violin
 Jarboe – backing vocals
 James Plotkin – electric guitar
 Phil Puleo – drums, percussion, bells, dulcimer
 Kurt Ralske – flugelhorn
 Bill Rieflin – piano
 Birgit Staudt – accordion
 Norman Westberg – electric guitar

 Additional musicians
 Tore Honoré Bøe – effects
 Irene – backing vocals
 Ole Henrik Moe – effects
 Ryland Walker Patterson – backing vocals
 Helge Sten – effects
 Mika Vainio – effects
Production and additional personnel
 Martin Bisi – engineering, programming, keyboards
 Chris Griffin – engineering
 Mike Moore – assistant engineer
 Clinton Steele – engineering
 Palmer Wood – assistant engineer

Release history

References 

1998 debut albums
Albums produced by Michael Gira
Young God Records albums